Remember Sports is an American indie rock band from Philadelphia, Pennsylvania, United States. Formed in Gambier, Ohio, and originally just named Sports, they have released four albums on Father/Daughter Records.

History
Remember Sports formed in 2012 when all members were attending Kenyon College in Gambier, Ohio. They released their first album in 2014 on Bandcamp titled Sunchokes. In 2015, Sports signed to Father/Daughter Records, where they released their second album titled All Of Something. The album was produced by Kyle Gilbride (Waxahatchee, Upset, Field Mouse). All Of Something was recorded primarily while most of the members were still in college. The album received four stars out of five by Rolling Stone magazine.  The album was listed at number ten on PopMatters list titled "The Best Indie Pop of 2015".

In August 2016, Remember Sports released a demo of their song "Makin It Right", which was featured on the Clearmountain Compilation Vol. 1.

In November 2017, the band announced their name change from Sports to Remember Sports to avoid confusion with other bands, including the Oklahoma-based band, Sports. In 2018, the band released their third album titled Slow Buzz. In 2020, the group contributed a cover of the song "Just the Girl" by the Click Five for Saving for a Custom Van, a tribute compilation celebrating the life of musician Adam Schlesinger. In 2021, the band announced their fourth LP, Like a Stone, released on April 23, 2021.

Band members
Carmen Perry (vocals, guitar, songwriter)
Catherine Dwyer (vocals, bass)
Jack Washburn (vocals, guitar)
Connor Perry (drums)

Discography
Studio albums
Sports (2013, self-released)
Sunchokes (2014, self-released)
All of Something (2015, Father/Daughter)
Slow Buzz (2018, Father/Daughter)
Like a Stone (2021, Father/Daughter)
Live Albums
Remember Sports on Audiotree Live (2018, Audiotree Music)
live @ port (2015, self-released)

References

Musical groups from Ohio
Musical groups established in 2014
2014 establishments in Ohio
Father/Daughter Records artists